Hans Spaan (born 24 December 1958, in Castricum) is a Dutch former Grand Prix motorcycle road racer from the Netherlands. He had his best year in 1989 when he won four races and finished the season in second place behind Àlex Crivillé in the 125cc world championship, and in 1990 when he won five races and finished again in second place in the 125 class, this time to Loris Capirossi.

Career statistics

Grand Prix motorcycle racing

Races by year
(key) (Races in bold indicate pole position) (Races in italics indicate fastest lap)

References 

1958 births
Living people
Dutch motorcycle racers
50cc World Championship riders
125cc World Championship riders
People from Assen
80cc World Championship riders
Sportspeople from Drenthe
20th-century Dutch people